Carbacid Investments plc , is a manufacturing and investment company in Kenya, the largest economy in the East African Community.  The company manufactures and markets carbon dioxide gas for food processing, industrial use and medical use, as well as dry ice. It also tests and validates gas cylinders.

Carbacid Investments currently has a market share of above 65% in the regional carbon dioxide market. The shares of the company's stock are listed on the Nairobi Securities Exchange (NSE), where they trade under the symbol CARB.

Overview
The company is the largest manufacturer of food, medical and industrial CO2 in the region. In the financial year that ended 31 July 2016, the company turnover was valued at KSh.831,761,000/= (approx. US$8,317,610). Net profits were at KSh.375,568,000/= (approx. US$3,755,680). The company's total assets were valued at KSh.3,081,768,000/= (approx. US$30,817,680), with shareholders' equity of KSh:2,674,198,000/= (approx. US$26,741,980).

History 
Carbacid Investments traces its roots to BEA Sawmills Limited, a company that was first to extract carbon dioxide from a natural underground reservoir in Kereita Forest in Kenya in 1933. Carbacid was officially incorporated in 1961 and listed at the Nairobi Securities Exchange (NSE) in 1972 following a series of acquisitions.

Operations
Carbacid Investments is mainly involved in the mining, purification and distribution of carbon dioxide gas to soft drink manufacturers and to beer bottlers. The company also makes medical CO2 for use in hospitals and other medical facilities and laboratories including universities. Other products manufactured by Carbacid include dry ice, which is used in the preservation of cold temperatures when shipping sensitive biological and chemical material. Carbacid's distribution network extends across the whole of East Africa, serving customers in Kenya, Uganda, Tanzania, Rwanda, Burundi, Ethiopia, Eastern DRC, Zambia, South Sudan and Somalia.

Member companies
The companies that comprise the Carbacid Investments Limited include, but are not limited, to the following Kenya registered subsidiaries:

 Carbacid (CO2) Limited – The flagship company of the group. Its principal activities  involve the mining, purification and sale of carbon dioxide gas. This company is a 100% subsidiary of Carbacid Investments Limited.
 Goodison Twenty Nine Limited – An investment company, wholly owned by Carbacid Investments Limited.
 Goodison Forty Seven Limited – An investment company, wholly owned by Carbacid Investments Limited.

Ownership
The shares of the Carbacid Investments Limited are listed on the NSE, where they trade under the symbol CARB.  the shareholding of Carbacid Investments was as follows:

See also
 List of wealthiest people in Kenya
 Nairobi Securities Exchange
 Economy of Kenya

References

External links
Carbacid Official Website
 Carbacid Posts Flat 2013/2014 financial Year Profits
Carbacid Profit Up 28 Percent As Rival BOC Targets Its Turf

Financial services companies established in 1961
Companies listed on the Nairobi Securities Exchange
Manufacturing companies based in Nairobi
Carbon dioxide
Chemical companies of Kenya
Kenyan companies established in 1961
Industrial gases